The British 4th Destroyer Flotilla , or Fourth Destroyer Flotilla, was a naval formation of the Royal Navy from August 1909 to July 1951.

History
In 1907 the Home Fleet had a large formation of destroyers called the Home Fleet Flotilla of destroyers, Between February and June 1909 it was divided to form the 2nd and 4th Destroyer Flotillas. Between 1909 and 1912 it was part of the Home Fleet - 3rd Division at Portsmouth. From 1912 to August 1914 it was reassigned and operating with the 1st Fleet. At the start of World War One the flotilla was reassigned to the new Grand Fleet and was engaged at the Battle of Jutland it remained with the GF until September 1916 when it was transferred to the Humber Force that was receiving shore support from the Humber Station till December 1916. The flotilla was next allocated to the Portsmouth Command until July 1917. After being ordered to leave Portsmouth it was reassigned to the Commander-in-Chief, Devonport where it remained till November 1918. Following the end of World War One it was placed back with the Home Fleet until November 1919 when it was re-allocated to the Atlantic Fleet until August 1923. It was reassigned to the Mediterranean Fleet where it remained until August 1936 when it was disbanded.  The flotilla was re-activated in September 1938 until October 1939 using only Tribal Class destroyers. I was next sent to join the Home Fleet from October 1939 – August 1941. Sent back to the Mediterranean to join Force H from August 1941 – April 1942. It returned to the Home Fleet in April 1942 and stayed with it till November. Between November 1942 and January 1943 it was back operating in Mediterranean.In January 1943 it was sent to join the Eastern Fleet in Trincomalee, Ceylon and remained there until October 1943. Sent back to Europe to re-join Force H in the Mediterranean until January 1944 before returning Ceylon. It stays with the East Indies Fleet until November 1944 then is ordered back to Europe to join forces in the Mediterranean Sea until 1946. It transfers back to home waters where it stays until March 1951 it was re-designated the 4th Destroyer Squadron. The unit reforms again as part of the Mediterranean Fleet

Organizational changes
Note: Command structure organizational changes took place within Royal Navy post war period the term Flotilla was previously applied to a tactical unit until 1951 which led to the creation of three specific Flag Officers, Flotillas responsible for the Eastern, Home and Mediterranean fleets the existing destroyer flotillas were re-organized now as administrative squadrons.

Operational deployments

Administration

Captains (D) afloat 4th Destroyer Flotilla
Incomplete list of post holders included:

Composition 1946 to 1950
Included: 
,  Home Fleet 1946-1948
4th Destroyer Squadron
  (Leader)
  - (March 1948)
  - (May 1948)
 * - (February 1947
 * - (June 1947)
  - (December 1946)
  - (April 1947)

, Home Fleet  1949
4th Destroyer Squadron
 HMS Agincourt (Leader)
 HMS Aisne
 HMS Alamein
 HMS Barrosa
 HMS Corunna
 HMS Dunkirk
 HMS Jutland
, Home Fleet 1950
4th Destroyer Squadron
 HMS Agincourt (Leader)
 HMS Aisne - (to September 1950)
 HMS Alamein
 HMS Barrosa
 HMS Corunna
 HMS Dunkirk
 HMS Jutland  - (to April 1950)

References

Sources
 Brassey's Naval and Shipping Annual. London, England: William Clowes and Sons, Limited. 1921. 
 Harley, Simon; Lovell, Tony. (2018) "Fourth Destroyer Flotilla (Royal Navy) - The Dreadnought Project". www.dreadnoughtproject.org. Harley and Lovell.
  Hobbs, David (2014). Warships of the Great War Era: A History in Ship Models. Barnsley, England: Seaforth Publishing. .
 Watson, Dr Graham. (2015) Royal Navy Organisation and Ship Deployments 1900-1914". www.naval-history.net. G. Smith. 
 Watson, Dr Graham. (2015) "Royal Navy Organisation and Ship Deployment, Inter-War Years 1914-1918". www.naval-history.net. Gordon Smith.
 Watson, Dr Graham. (2015) "Royal Navy Organisation in World War 2, 1939-1945". www.naval-history.net. Gordon Smith.
 Willmott, H. P. (2009). The Last Century of Sea Power, Volume 1: From Port Arthur to Chanak, 1894–1922. Bloomington, IN, USA: Indiana University Press. .

Destroyer flotillas of the Royal Navy
Military units and formations established in 1909
Military units and formations disestablished in 1941